Razee Mohammad Fakhrul (born 5 August 1979) is a Bangladesh Awami League politician and the incumbent member of parliament.

Career
Fakhrul majored in accounting in a college in the United States. He was elected upazila chairman from Debidwar in 2008. He is a member of parliament and member of the Parliamentary Standing committee on Foreign Affairs. He was elected to the 10th parliament from Comilla-4 as an independent candidate.

Personal life
Fakhruls' grandfather, Ahmed Ali Sarder, was a member of the Pakistan National Assembly. His father, AFM Fakhrul Islam Munshi, was twice elected to the parliament of Bangladesh.

References

Living people
1979 births
Awami League politicians
11th Jatiya Sangsad members
10th Jatiya Sangsad members